The 1978–79 North Carolina Tar Heels men's basketball team represented the University of North Carolina at Chapel Hill.

Schedule

|-
!colspan=9 style=| ACC Tournament

|-
!colspan=9 style=| NCAA Tournament

Rankings

^Coaches did not release Week 1 or Week 2 polls.

References

North Carolina Tar Heels men's basketball seasons
North Carolina
Tar
Tar
North Carolina